Kim Geon-su (born 13 September 1965) is a South Korean judoka. He competed in the men's heavyweight event at the 1992 Summer Olympics.

References

1965 births
Living people
South Korean male judoka
Olympic judoka of South Korea
Judoka at the 1992 Summer Olympics
Place of birth missing (living people)
Asian Games medalists in judo
Judoka at the 1990 Asian Games
Asian Games bronze medalists for South Korea
Medalists at the 1990 Asian Games
20th-century South Korean people